Waldo's Last Stand is a 1940 Our Gang short comedy film directed by Edward Cahn.  It was the 193rd Our Gang short (194th episode, 105th talking short, 106th talking episode, and 25th MGM produced episode) that was released.

Plot
The gang offers to help Waldo attract customers to his lemonade stand which is doing poor business. Redecorating their barn as a lavish nightclub, the kids stage an elaborate floor show, with Darla as the star vocalist. Unfortunately, their efforts attract only one patron—a surly, stone-faced new kid named Froggy. Spanky and the others try to persuade Froggy into buying a drink, even going as far as singing an impromptu song about dryness and thirst, but to no avail. The kids then come up with an idea: to put a heater under Froggy which would heat him up and force him to buy a drink. When Spanky asks Froggy why he would not buy a drink, Froggy responds that he does not have any money and that it is too hot in the barn.  The gang realizes that no one other than Froggy showed up for the show because all the other neighborhood kids were either participants in the show or somehow connected with its production.

Cast

The Gang
 Mickey Gubitosi as Mickey
 Darla Hood as Darla
 George McFarland as Spanky
 Carl Switzer as Alfalfa
 Billie Thomas as Buckwheat
 Darwood Kaye as Waldo
 Leonard Landy as Leonard

Additional cast
 Billy Laughlin as Froggy
 Janet Burston as Jeanette
 Clyde Willson as Clyde

Dancers/Performers in the floor show
Lavonne Battle, Shirley Jean Doble, Donna Jean Edmonsond, Helen Guthrie, Patsy Irish, Jackie Krenk, Bobby Sommers, Betty Jean Striegler (Betta St. John), Mary Ann Such, Patsy Anne Thompson, Patricia Wheeler

Notes
Another Our Ganger leaves as Waldo's Last Stand marked the final appearance of Darwood Kaye. Kaye's film career is described in the 2009 book, Finding Waldo, written by one of his four sons.
Waldo's Last Stand is one of four sound Our Gang shorts (and the only MGM-produced entry) that fell into the public domain after the copyright lapsed in the 1960s (the other three being Bear Shooters, School's Out and Our Gang Follies of 1938). As such, these films frequently appear on inexpensive video and/or DVD compilations.

See also
 Our Gang filmography

References

External links

1940 films
American black-and-white films
Films directed by Edward L. Cahn
Metro-Goldwyn-Mayer short films
1940 comedy films
Our Gang films
1940s American films
1940s English-language films